Jakob Hlasek and Claudio Mezzadri were the defending champions but only Hlasek competed that year with Joey Rive.

Hlasek and Rive lost in the first round to Darren Cahill and Brad Drewett.

Paul Annacone and John Fitzgerald won in the final 6–2, 6–2 against Jim Grabb and Christo van Rensburg.

Seeds
Champion seeds are indicated in bold text while text in italics indicates the round in which those seeds were eliminated.

 Ken Flach /  Robert Seguso (first round)
 Rick Leach /  Jim Pugh (quarterfinals)
 Sergio Casal /  Emilio Sánchez (quarterfinals)
 Jorge Lozano /  Todd Witsken (first round)

Draw

External links
 1988 Paris Open Doubles draw

Doubles